Malham Moor is a civil parish in the Craven district of North Yorkshire, England. Its population was estimated at 70 in 2015.
  
It has a joint parish council, Kirkby Malhamdale Parish Council, with the parishes of Malham, Kirkby Malham and Hanlith.

There is no village in the parish.  The parish includes scattered farms and houses, Malham Tarn and large areas of moorland, including Fountains Fell.  The upland area identified on Ordnance Survey maps as Malham Moor lies outside the parish, to the east. It is north west of Threshfield along Malham Moor Lane. Its summit is at 411m.()

Malham Moor was historically a township in the ancient parish of Kirkby Malham in the West Riding of Yorkshire.  It became a civil parish in 1866, and in 1974 was transferred to the new county of North Yorkshire.

References

Civil parishes in North Yorkshire